Wilmarth School is a school building in Ashland, Wisconsin which was built in 1891.  It was added to the National Register of Historic Places in 1980.  It is noted for its architecture—the design of Henry Wildhagen—which is of the 19th- and 20th-century revival styles.

It is a two-story-plus-basement cream brick and brownstone building.  It has a center "chisel-roof" tower containing the front entrance, which has a Palladian-like sidelights and stairlight.  It has a stone panel with the school's name and three windows over a center arch.  It has two large cream brick chimneys with corbelled caps and a hipped roof.

Wildhagen also designed three other schools in Ashland, also NRHP-listed:  Ashland Middle School (1904), Beaser School (1899), and Ellis School (1900).

Notes

References

School buildings on the National Register of Historic Places in Wisconsin
National Register of Historic Places in Ashland County, Wisconsin
Victorian architecture in Wisconsin
School buildings completed in 1895
Buildings and structures in Ashland County, Wisconsin
1895 establishments in Wisconsin